Earth to Echo is a 2014 American science fiction film directed by Dave Green, and produced by Ryan Kavanaugh and Andrew Panay. Based on a screenplay by Henry Gayden, the film stars Teo Halm, Brian "Astro" Bradley, Reese Hartwig, and Ella Wahlestedt as four neighborhood friends who find a robotic, telekinetic alien in the desert, and are soon hunted by dangerous forces who seek to take the alien, who the kids name "Echo", for themselves. The film is shot in a found footage style through many perspectives, including through a handheld camera, smartphone cameras, and the robot's eyes.

The film was originally developed and produced by the Walt Disney Company, under the leadership of Rich Ross, but Disney, unsatisfied with the project, sold the distribution rights to Relativity Media in 2013, on the advice of producer Andrew Panay. Relativity Media theatrically released the film in the United States on July 2, 2014. Earth to Echo received mixed reviews from critics, who criticized the cinematography and editing. Despite mixed reviews, the film was a box office success, grossing over $45.3 million worldwide against its $13 million budget.

Plot

Three childhood friends, Alex, Tuck, and Munch, live in a small Nevada neighborhood that will soon be demolished for a highway construction project. The day before they're set to move, each of their phones start displaying mysterious patterns, which Munch discovers lead to coordinates in the nearby desert. They decide to spend their last night together biking to the coordinates to investigate, recording their experience on their smartphones and video cameras.

The three arrive at the coordinates and follow the map to a dusty, rusted object under an electrical tower. They take the object with them as they follow another map to a nearby barn, where the object telekinetically repairs itself using various objects around the barn. The boys discover the object contains a cybernetic alien that can answer yes or no questions. The alien reveals that it is from another planet and has accidentally crash landed on Earth after being shot down and is seriously injured as a result. The group follows another map to a pawn shop, where the object further repairs itself. With its eyes damaged, it uses Alex's phone camera to see. As they leave the pawn shop, they decide to name the alien Echo.

They follow another map to the house of Emma, a classmate of the boys, who discovers Echo and joins their group. They follow another map to an arcade, where Alex is caught by a security guard. Emma goes back to rescue him while Echo and Munch cause a distraction. After rescuing Alex, the four stop at a restaurant, keeping Echo hidden in a backpack, but a construction worker steals the backpack and loads it into a truck. Munch jumps into the back of the truck as it pulls away, leaving the rest of the group behind. To catch up to them, Alex and Emma help Tuck steal his brother's car, which they drive to the construction site Munch and Echo are being held at.

The three try to get in, but are stopped by the same construction worker, who reveals himself as Dr. Lawrence Masden, a scientist who intends to keep Echo on Earth so that he can study its technology. Masden's group are revealed as the group that shot Echo down in the first place. Masden tries to convince the kids that if Echo repairs the spaceship and takes off in it, it will kill everyone in the neighborhood; the kids pretend to be convinced, and promise to help Masden find the spaceship if he takes them to Munch and Echo. Masden brings the three to a scrap junkyard, where Echo seemingly dies as a result of the violent experimentation inflicted on him, but with encouragement from the kids, he revives, completes his repairs, and distracts the agents long enough for the kids to drive back home. At Alex's house, the spaceship key goes into the ground by itself, and they realize the agents invented the false construction project as a cover to dig up the neighborhood, as the entire ship is in the ground beneath it.

Trusting Echo, Alex takes him down the hole made by the key. At the bottom, the group finds a room that turns out to be the spaceship's core, where the key connects to the rest of it. Once the key is connected to the core, allowing Echo to use it to pilot the ship, he begins starting up the ship. After they all say goodbye and the kids exit the core, the ship's separate parts telekinetically come out of the ground all over the neighborhood, and reassemble it in mid-air, and all without destroying the neighborhood. Once fully reassembled, the ship then flies away. The project put on by the agents is abandoned but Alex and Munch relocate anyway, as their families have already bought new homes elsewhere. However, as Tuck's didn't, he stays, and new neighbors and residents move in to the neighborhood. Sometime later, the three and Emma meet up again, as the film ends with Alex holding up his phone towards the sky.

In a post-credit scene, Alex addresses his friends as his phone apparently starts to move and glitch out.

Cast

 Teo Halm as Alex Nichols
 Brian "Astro" Bradley as Tucker "Tuck" Simms
 Reese Hartwig as Reginald "Munch" Barrett
 Ella Wahlestedt as Emma Hastings
 Jason Gray-Stanford as Dr. Lawrence Masden
 Algee Smith as Marcus Simms
 Cassius Willis as Calvin Simms
 Sonya Leslie as Theresa Simms
 Kerry O'Malley as Janice Douglas
 Virginia Louise Smith as Betty Barrett
 Peter Mackenzie as James Hastings
 Valerie Wildman as Christine Hastings
 Mary Pat Gleason as Dusty (Mullet Lady at Bar)
 Chris Wylde as Security Guard
Brooke Dillman as Diner Waitress
 Myk Watford as Blake Douglas
 Tiffany Espensen as Charlie
 Israel Broussard as Cameron
 Sean Carroll as Podcast Voice (voice)

Production
Earth to Echo was commissioned by Andrew Panay, Panay Films President of Production, under the working title, Untitled Wolf Adventure, while the studio shifted leadership between Rich Ross and Alan Horn. After Horn's succession as Chairman and viewing a final cut of the film, he decided to put the film into turnaround. After Producer Andrew Panay met with Relativity President Tucker Tooley, Disney eventually sold the film's distribution rights and copyrights to Relativity Media in 2013.

Distribution

Release
The film was initially scheduled for release on January 10, 2014 and April 25, 2014. After being delayed, Earth to Echo premiered on June 14, 2014 at the Los Angeles Film Festival and opened in theaters across the U.S. on July 2, 2014.

Marketing
The first trailer was released on December 12, 2013.

Home media
The film was released on DVD and Blu-ray by 20th Century Fox Home Entertainment on October 21, 2014.

Reception

Box office
Earth to Echo opened on July 2, 2014 in the United States in 3,179 theaters, ranking at #6, and accumulating $8,364,658 over its 3-day opening weekend (an average of $2,590 per venue) and $13,567,557 since its Wednesday launch. , the film had grossed $38.9 million in the U.S. and $6.4 million overseas, for a total of $45.3 million worldwide, against a $13 million budget, making it a moderate box office success.

Critical reception
  Audiences polled by CinemaScore gave the film an average grade of "A-" on an A+ to F scale.

Accolades
At the Teen Choice Awards, Earth to Echo received a nomination for Choice Summer Movie. Hartwig won Best Performance in a Feature Film at the 36th Young Artist Awards.

See also
 List of films set in Las Vegas

References

External links
 

2014 films
2010s science fiction adventure films
American children's adventure films
American science fiction adventure films
American robot films
Camcorder films
Films scored by Joseph Trapanese
Films about extraterrestrial life
Films directed by Dave Green
Films set in Nevada
Films set in the Las Vegas Valley
Films shot in California
Films with screenplays by Henry Gayden
Found footage films
Relativity Media films
2014 directorial debut films
2010s English-language films
2010s American films